Beiseker Airport  is located  east of Beiseker, Alberta, Canada along Alberta Highway 9. The airport is located within rural Rocky View County, but is operated by the Village of Beiseker.

References

External links
 Page about this airport on COPA's Places to Fly airport directory

Rocky View County
Registered aerodromes in Alberta